The Albanian Coalition from Preševo Valley (or Koalicija Albanaca Preševske doline) is a coalition of groups representing the Albanian inhabitants of the Preševo Valley in South Serbia.

It ran as list number 17 in the election in January 2007, winning 16,973 votes, equaling 0.42% of the national vote, and gaining one seat.

In the election in May 2008, they won 16,801 votes, equaling 0.41% of the national vote, and gaining again one seat.

In the election in May 2012, they ran as list number 15 winning 13,384 votes, equaling 0.30% of the national vote, and gaining again one seat.

Electoral results

Parliamentary elections

See also
 Preševo Valley
 Preševo
 Bujanovac
 Medveđa
 Insurgency in the Preševo Valley
 Liberation Army of Preševo, Medveđa and Bujanovac
 Albanians in Serbia

References

Political parties of minorities in Serbia
Political party alliances in Serbia
Albanians in Serbia